Kenkichi Ishiguro (born 10 August 1946) is a Japanese equestrian. He competed in two events at the 1976 Summer Olympics.

References

1946 births
Living people
Japanese male equestrians
Olympic equestrians of Japan
Equestrians at the 1976 Summer Olympics
Place of birth missing (living people)